Samuel Gilbert Bratton (August 19, 1888 – September 22, 1963) was a United States senator from New Mexico and a United States circuit judge of the United States Court of Appeals for the Tenth Circuit.

Education and career

Born in Kosse, Texas on August 19, 1888, Bratton attended the public schools. A graduate of the state Normal School, he taught school for some years in Claude, Texas and Hereford, Texas. He read law and was admitted to the bar in 1909, whereupon he began practice in Farwell, Texas. He continued his practice upon moving to Clovis, New Mexico in 1915. From 1919 to 1921 he served as the district court judge for the fifth judicial district of that state. Upon division of the district, he continued in the same capacity for the ninth judicial district until 1923, when he succeeded Herbert F. Raynolds to become an associate justice of the New Mexico Supreme Court. He remained in this position until 1924, when he resigned to accept the Democratic nomination for the United States Senate.

Congressional service

Bratton was elected as a Democrat to the United States Senate in 1924 and was reelected in 1930 and served from March 4, 1925, until his resignation, effective June 24, 1933. He served as Chairman of the Committee on Irrigation and Reclamation in the 73rd United States Congress.

Federal judicial service

Bratton was nominated by President Franklin D. Roosevelt on June 1, 1933, to a seat on the United States Court of Appeals for the Tenth Circuit vacated by Judge John Hazelton Cotteral. He was confirmed by the United States Senate on June 1, 1933, and received his commission the same day. He was among the candidates for the United States Supreme Court vacancy created by the retirement of Willis Van Devanter in 1937, but was passed over by Roosevelt in favor of Hugo Black. Bratton served as Chief Judge and as a member of the Judicial Conference of the United States from 1956 to 1959. He assumed senior status on March 1, 1961. His service terminated on September 22, 1963, due to his death in Albuquerque, New Mexico. He is interred in Fairview Park Cemetery in Albuquerque.

References

Sources

External links
 

1888 births
1963 deaths
People from Kosse, Texas
New Mexico Democrats
Justices of the New Mexico Supreme Court
Judges of the United States Court of Appeals for the Tenth Circuit
Democratic Party United States senators from New Mexico
People from Parmer County, Texas
20th-century American judges
United States federal judges admitted to the practice of law by reading law
People from Clovis, New Mexico
20th-century American politicians
United States court of appeals judges appointed by Franklin D. Roosevelt